The History Meeting House is a municipal institution of culture in Warsaw, Poland. HMH was founded in 2006 and its activity is focused on the testimonies of the 20th century history. The idea to set up HMH was developed by the KARTA Center - non-governmental institution documenting history.

The base of HMH's activities is multimedia exhibition "The Faces of Totalitarianism", which presents the totalitarian experience in the 20th century from several national perspectives. The House offers also other historical exhibitions, film shows, meetings and debates.

External links
 Homepage (English language version)

Organizations established in 2006
Organisations based in Warsaw
Polish educational societies
History organisations based in Poland